Saint-Sulpice-la-Pointe (before 2013: Saint-Sulpice; Languedocien: Sant Somplesi) is a commune in the Tarn department in southern France. During World War 2 a concentration camp was built in this town.

Population

Transport

Saint-Sulpice station has rail connections to Toulouse, Rodez, Aurillac and Castres.

Remarkable places and monuments

See also
Communes of the Tarn department

References

Communes of Tarn (department)